Mount Lidgbird, also Mount Ledgbird and Big Hill, is located in the southern section of Lord Howe Island, just north of Mount Gower, from which it is separated by the saddle at the head of Erskine Valley, and has its peak at  above sea level.

The trek to the summit is for expert climbers only. Ropes are needed to scale the cliffs and slippery, steep terrain. In comparison, Mount Gower is an easy hike. Halfway up the mountain is Goat House Cave, a former shelter for 19th-century Kentia palm gatherers. From this spot, visitors can see nesting masked boobies and numerous red-tailed tropicbirds.

Etymology
Mount Lidgbird is named by the naval officer Captain Henry Lidgbird Ball in honour of his father, George Lidgbird Ball. Ball junior first sighted Lord Howe Island in 1788 while he was on his way to Norfolk Island in the ship HMS Supply. He also named the nearby rock outcrop Ball's Pyramid.

Flora

Palm species growing on the mountain include Hedyscepe and Lepidorrhachis.

See also

List of mountains in Australia

References 

Tropical and subtropical moist broadleaf forests
Geography of Lord Howe Island
Shield volcanoes of Australia
Hotspot volcanoes
Volcanoes of New South Wales
Mountains of New South Wales
Volcanoes of the Pacific Ocean
Volcanoes of Zealandia
Extinct volcanoes
Miocene volcanism
Polygenetic shield volcanoes